Stephen Henry Bracey (August 1, 1950 – February 14, 2006) was an American basketball player.

Biography
Bracey grew up in Brooklyn, where he attended Midwood High School.

A 6' 1" guard, he first played at Kilgore Junior College in Texas, where in his sophomore year he averaged 33.4 points per game, and was the top junior college scorer. He then transferred to the University of Tulsa, where he averaged 21.3 points and 4.9 rebounds in his two-year career. He was named to the All-Missouri Valley Conference team as well as honorable mention All-American as a senior. He was inducted into the Tulsa University Athletic of Fame in 2000.

Bracey played three seasons (1972–1975) in the National Basketball Association as a member of the Atlanta Hawks and Golden State Warriors. He averaged 6.1 points per game and won an NBA Championship with Golden State in 1975.

Bracey died from diabetes-related complications in 2006.

NBA career statistics

Regular season

|-
| align="left" | 1972–73
| align="left" | Atlanta
| 70 || - || 15.0 || .486 || - || .664 || 1.5 || 1.8 || - || - || 6.5
|-
| align="left" | 1973–74
| align="left" | Atlanta
| 75 || - || 19.5 || .463 || - || .719 || 1.9 || 3.1 || 0.8 || 0.1 || 7.3
|-
| style="text-align:left;background:#afe6ba;" | 1974–75†
| align="left" | Golden State
| 42 || - || 8.1 || .415 || - || .658 || 0.9 || 1.2 || 0.3 || 0.0 || 3.2
|- class="sortbottom"
| style="text-align:center;" colspan="2"| Career
| 187 || - || 15.3 || .466 || - || .684 || 1.6 || 2.2 || 0.6 || 0.1 || 6.1
|}

Playoffs

|-
| align="left" | 1972–73
| align="left" | Atlanta
| 6 || - || 20.5 || .511 || - || .688 || 2.2 || 3.3 || - || - || 9.8
|-
| style="text-align:left;background:#afe6ba;" | 1974–75†
| align="left" | Golden State
| 4 || - || 3.5 || .429 || - || 1.000 || 0.3 || 0.8 || 0.8 || 0.0 || 2.5
|- class="sortbottom"
| style="text-align:center;" colspan="2"| Career
| 10 || - || 13.7 || .500 || - || .750 || 1.4 || 2.3 || 0.8 || 0.0 || 6.9
|}

References

External links

1950 births
2006 deaths
Basketball players from New York City
Atlanta Hawks draft picks
Atlanta Hawks players
Deaths from diabetes
Golden State Warriors players
Junior college men's basketball players in the United States
Midwood High School alumni
Point guards
Sportspeople from Brooklyn
Tulsa Golden Hurricane men's basketball players
American men's basketball players